Suren Swargiary is an Asom Gana Parishad politician from Assam. He was elected in Assam Legislative Assembly election in 1985 and 1991 from Chapaguri constituency.

References 

Living people
Asom Gana Parishad politicians
Members of the Assam Legislative Assembly
People from Baksa district
Year of birth missing (living people)
Bodo people